Cluj International Music Competition (CIMC) is a biennial event hosted by the Gheorghe Dima Music Academy in Cluj-Napoca, Romania. Organised by Notes & Ties Cultural Association, CIMC has grown into a globally recognised classical music competition.

History 
First known as the Gheorghe Dima International Music Competition, the event was started in 1984 by the Gheorghe Dima Music Academy and ran continuously for twelve editions. After a gap of thirteen years, it was revived and between 2011 and 2019 it was dedicated to woodwind instruments. The last five editions, dedicated to pairs of instruments (flute and clarinet in 2011, 2015, 2017 and 2019; oboe and trumpet in 2013) marked a leap forward for the competition's international recognition, with some of the most recognised performers in the world as jury members and a large number of contestants from all over the globe.

Jury Members 
The competition has drawn attention for inviting jurors who are themselves young, and for inviting previous winners to be jurors for future competitions.

2021 Hybrid edition 
President of the juries Răzvan Poptean (Romania)

References 

Competitions
Music competitions in Romania